Bayan Palace ( Qaṣr Bayān) is the main palace of the Emir of Kuwait. It is located in the Bayan area.

History
Bayan Palace was opened in 1986 to host the fifth conference of the Arab League. The palace also has an international conference centre attached. There is also a  Emiri tent within the palace grounds, which was erected in 1991 after the liberation of Kuwait.

References

1986 establishments in Kuwait
Palaces in Kuwait
Royal residences in Kuwait
Buildings and structures in Kuwait City